Kinard is an unincorporated community in southwestern Calhoun County, Florida, United States. The main roads through Kinard are State Road 73 and County Road 392.

Unincorporated communities in Calhoun County, Florida
Unincorporated communities in Florida